King Caesar is a character in the Godzilla film series.

King Caesar may also refer to:
A British game of tag from the 19th century; see 
Ezra Weston II (known as "King Caesar"), a 19th-century Massachusetts shipbuilder and merchant

See also
King Caesar House, a museum in Duxbury, Massachusetts, the former home of Ezra Weston II